Dan Duran may refer to:

Dan Duran (baseball) (born 1954), American baseball player
Dan Duran (broadcaster), Canadian broadcaster and actor
Dan Duran (filmmaker) (born 1990), American documentary filmmaker and producer